When Knights Were Bold is a 1916 British silent comedy film directed by Maurice Elvey and starring Gerald Ames, Marjorie Day and Gwynne Herbert. It was based on the 1906 play When Knights Were Bold by Harriett Jay.

Cast
 Gerald Ames - Sir Bryan Ballymore
 Marjorie Day - Maid
 Gwynne Herbert - Isaacson
 Philip Hewland - Barker
 Hayford Hobbs - Widdicombe
 Edna Maude - Aunt Thornridge
 Janet Ross - Lady Rowena
 James Welch - Sir Guy de Vere
 Bert Wynne - Whittle

References

External links

1916 films
British silent feature films
1916 comedy films
1910s English-language films
Films directed by Maurice Elvey
British films based on plays
British comedy films
British black-and-white films
1910s British films
Silent comedy films